The Sand Prairie-Scrub Oak State Nature Preserve, formerly called the Mason County State Wildlife Refuge and Recreation Area, is a natural area located in the U.S. state of Illinois. Containing 1,460 acres (591 ha), it is a dedicated state nature preserve. It is located in western Mason County. The nearest town is Kilbourne, Illinois and the nearest numbered highway is Illinois Route 97.  It contains fragmentary examples of the ecosystem described in its name.

The Sand Prairie-Scrub Oak Nature Preserve is described on its webpage as "a mixture of dry sand prairie, dry sand savanna and dry sand forest."  Areas of savanna and forest are characterized by black oak and blackjack oak, with some mockernut.  In a 2015 research and inspection fan-out, arborists discovered the first example of dwarf chinkapin oak identified in Illinois.  Other unusual trees identified in the preserve include what are believed to be among the northernmost natural range trees of black hickory.  Prairie grasses such as little bluestem, and sand plant life such as eastern prickly pear cactus, can be found.

Sand Prairie-Scrub Oak was dedicated as a State Nature Preserve in April 1970.

Current status
In the 2010s, Sand Prairie-Scrub Oak is managed by the Illinois Department of Natural Resources (IDNR) as a state nature preserve.  The preserve does not have on-site staff, and is managed as a disjunct area of Sand Ridge State Forest, a larger conservation area within the same county.

References

External links
 Sand Prairie-Scrub Oak State Nature Preserve

1970 establishments in Illinois
Protected areas established in 1970
Protected areas of Mason County, Illinois
State parks of Illinois
Nature reserves in Illinois